Godfrey 'Bai' Maynard Wrentmore (20 February 1893 – 16 August 1953) was a South African sportsman who played first-class cricket with Western Province and represented his country at rugby union.

Born in Okiep, Namaqualand, Wrentmore appeared in five first-class matches for Western Province during the 1910/11 Currie Cup cricket season. He also played rugby with Western Province and in 1912/13 toured the British Isles, Ireland and France with the South African national rugby union team. Wrentmore, a centre, failed to break into the Test side but did play in nine tour matches for the Springboks.

References

External links
Cricinfo: Godfrey Wrentmore

1893 births
1953 deaths
South African cricketers
Western Province cricketers
South African rugby union players
South Africa international rugby union players
Rugby union centres
Western Province (rugby union) players
Rugby union players from the Northern Cape